Restless & Dead is the first album by the Swedish thrash metal band Witchery. Released in 1998 on Necropolis Records, the album features members of the band Satanic Slaughter. The title is a play on the Accept album Restless and Wild.

Background

In 1997, the cult Swedish thrash metal band Satanic Slaughter split up, leaving only the vocalist Ztephan Dark. The other members of the band formed Witchery, along with Sharlee D'Angelo (Arch Enemy, Mercyful Fate) on bass guitar. Restless And Dead was their first studio album released under the Witchery name and was recorded in a week in Blue Hill Studios, Linköping, Sweden.

The album is in the style of thrash metal, though with some use of black metal and death metal aesthetics. These additions to the thrash metal template are less noticeable than in Satanic Slaughter and give the album a distinctive sound, that combination of styles being a rarity when the album was recorded.

This album introduces the distinctive Witchery "W", a sign that the band mascot Ben Wrangle shows on the front cover and also on the CD itself. The "W" is a misappropriation of the "devil horns" hand gesture invented by Ronnie James Dio while the vocalist with Black Sabbath.

Track listing
All music and lyrics written by Jensen unless otherwise stated.
 "The Reaper" - 2:19 (lyrics by Toxine)
 "Witchery" - 3:06
 "Midnight At The Graveyard" - 3:32 (music by Jensen/Toxine)
 "The Hangman" - 4:00
 "Awaiting The Exorcist" - 3:18 (music by Jensen/Corpse)
 "All Evil"- 3:21 (music by Jensen/Corpse)
 "The House Of Raining Blood" - 3:46 (lyrics by Jensen/D'Angelo)
 "Into Purgatory" - 4:05
 "Born In The Night" - 5:11 (music by Jensen/Corpse)
 "Restless And Dead" - 3:03

Personnel
 Toxine - vocals
 Richard Corpse - lead guitar
 Mique - drums
 Jensen - rhythm guitar
 Sharlee D'Angelo - bass guitar
 Johan Larsson and Andreas Deblén - additional vocals
 Engineered by Gunnar Jangbrand and Janne Karlsson
 Mastered by Göran Finnberg at the Mastering Room
 Produced by Witchery

References

1998 debut albums
Witchery albums